Belarus is a source, destination, and transit country for women, men, and children subjected to trafficking in persons, specifically forced prostitution and forced labor. The majority of identified Belarusian victims were females forced into prostitution abroad, including in: Russia, Germany, Poland, other European countries, Turkey, Israel, Lebanon, and the UAE. There were reports that women from low-income families in Belarus’ regions were subjected to forced prostitution in Minsk. Belarusian men, women, and children continued to be subjected to forced begging, as well as forced labor in the construction industry and other sectors in Russia. According to the Ministry of Interior, Belarusian single, unemployed females between the ages of 16 and 30 were most at risk of being trafficked. Human traffickers often used informal social networks to approach potential victims.

The Government of Belarus does not fully comply with the minimum standards for the elimination of trafficking; however, it is making significant efforts to do so. The government’s response to trafficking is difficult to gauge due to the closed nature of the government, sparse independent reporting, and general fear of government retaliation for criticism of the ruling regime. However, based on available information, the government appeared to have sustained its efforts to prosecute and punish trafficking offenders in 2009. While the government appeared to continue positive steps toward improved treatment of victims and support of the anti-trafficking NGO community, the overall political climate of intimidation was a natural obstacle to authentic government partnerships with victims and anti-trafficking organizations. Funding for victim assistance programs codified into law in 2005 remained unrealized.

The U.S. State Department's Office to Monitor and Combat Trafficking in Persons placed Belarus in "Tier 3"  in 2017.

Prosecution
The government sustained law enforcement efforts during the reporting period. Belarusian law prohibits trafficking in persons for both sexual exploitation and labor exploitation under Article 181 of its criminal code, which prescribes penalties ranging from two to 15 years’ imprisonment in addition to asset forfeiture. These penalties are sufficiently stringent and are commensurate with penalties prescribed for other serious crimes. The government reported 219 human trafficking investigations in 2009, including at least 10 labor trafficking investigations. Authorities reportedly prosecuted 61 cases under Article 181, and convicted 15 trafficking offenders under the same statute in 2009, down from 17 convictions in 2008. The government did not report how many of the convictions were for forced labor versus forced prostitution. Officials reported that the majority of convicted trafficking offenders were given imposed sentences of over eight years’ imprisonment, in addition to the forfeiture of assets.

While reports indicated that officials engaged in corrupt practices, there were no reports of government complicity in human trafficking during the reporting period – such information may have been limited because of lack of press freedom and imprisonment of citizens for criticizing government officials in Belarus. In general, the judiciary lacked independence, trial outcomes usually were predetermined, and many trials were conducted behind closed doors. The Ministry of Interior continued to provide at least partial funding for its anti-trafficking training center, which has trained 47 Belarusian law enforcement officers and officials from other governments as trafficking specialists since 2007. Courses at the center reportedly focused on anti-trafficking law enforcement techniques and victim assistance, and were developed in partnership with IOM, other international organizations, and NGOs. The government reported partnerships with the following governments on trafficking cases: Poland, Germany, the Czech Republic, Israel, and Turkey.

Protection
The government demonstrated minimal progress in protecting victims of trafficking during the reporting period, including a significant decrease in the number of victims identified. In 2009, authorities identified 369 victims of sex trafficking, including 35 children, and 29 labor trafficking victims in 2009, a significant decrease from a total of 591 victims identified in 2008. The government reported referring only 131 victims to service providers for assistance, raising concerns that the formal, national trafficking victim referral mechanism was not successfully implemented. Law enforcement officials generally referred trafficking victims to IOM or NGO shelters – which relied on donor funding – to provide short and longer term protection and rehabilitation; the government referred child trafficking victims to NGOs for assistance.

The government again failed to provide funding for specialized victim assistance programs pledged in a 2005 presidential decree, but provided some in-kind donations to NGOs. Victims could seek state medical assistance and some other services, such as vocational training, free of charge, but most victims declined assistance from government facilities. Government sources acknowledged that victims were more likely to trust NGOs than government sources of assistance. Anti-trafficking NGOs reported little government interference in their operations; they also reported improved communication with government officials during past year. In some instances during the reporting period, the government permitted NGO specialists to attend police interviews and closed court hearings upon victims’ requests.

The government claimed to have encouraged victims to participate in the investigation and prosecution of traffickers. The anti-trafficking training center reportedly emphasized the need to avoid coercing victims, which had been reported as a problem in the past. There were no reports of identified victims being penalized for unlawful acts committed as a direct result of being trafficked. Belarusian law allows for authorities to grant temporary residency status to foreign victims, though no victims chose this immigration relief during the reporting period.

Prevention
The government demonstrated modest progress in trafficking prevention activities during the reporting period. Citizens, the media, and NGOs in Belarus are often subjected to government intimidation and strict control, which limited open discussion about the trafficking situation in the country. Officials continued to conduct press conferences and briefings on the anti-trafficking situation in Belarus, focusing primarily on forced prostitution, during the reporting period. The government aired IOM-sponsored anti-trafficking public service announcements on state television and on television screens in subway stops, which resulted in an increased number of calls to IOM’s hotline. The Ministry of Interior continued to run a hotline offering information regarding the licensing status and legitimacy of marriage, modeling agencies, and agencies involved in work and study abroad. NGO's reported cooperation between the government hotline and their own hotlines, as well as partnerships with authorities in distributing NGO-funded public awareness materials. There were reports that some policies described by the Belarusian government as anti-trafficking measures were responsible for restricting Belarusian citizens’ ability to travel abroad for legitimate purposes. The government’s national action plan on trafficking, which expired in 2010, focused on illegal migration which may lead to confusion between trafficking and smuggling.

See also
 Human rights in Belarus
 Human trafficking in Europe

References

External links
 Legislationline, legislation on trafficking in human beings in Belarus

Belarus
Belarus
Human rights abuses in Belarus
Crime in Belarus by type